Charles Stephen Booth (January 27, 1897 – August 30, 1988) was a Canadian politician and barrister. He was elected to the House of Commons of Canada as a member of the Liberal Party in 1940 to represent the riding of Winnipeg North. Prior to his federal political experience, he served overseas in the Western University Battalion, Canadian Expeditionary Force then in northern Russia with the Royal Air Force as a pilot and in 1936 he became a lieutenant colonel and commander of the Winnipeg Light Infantry. From there he moved to London, England, where he was placed with the I Canadian Corps Headquarters, and promoted to colonel and assistant deputy adjutant general, then brigadier and deputy adjutant-general.

References

1897 births
British emigrants to Canada
Liberal Party of Canada MPs
Members of the House of Commons of Canada from Manitoba
Canadian Expeditionary Force officers
Canadian military personnel of World War II
1988 deaths